Molly of the Follies is a 1919 American comedy, silent black and white film directed by Edward Sloman. It is based on the story The Side-Show Girl by Peter Clark MacFarlane.

Cast
 Margarita Fisher as Molly Malone
 Jack Mower as Joe Holmquist
 Lule Warrenton as Kate Malone
 Millard L. Webb as Milton Wallace
 J. Farrell MacDonald as Swannick
 Mary Lee Wise as Emily Ewing / Aunt Henrietta

References

External links

 
 

Films directed by Edward Sloman
English comedy
British comedy films
1919 comedy films
1919 films
British silent films
British black-and-white films
Films shot in New York City
American Film Company films
Pathé Exchange films
1910s American films
1910s British films